Ylivieska Airfield  is an aerodrome located in Vähäkangas, Ylivieska, Finland,  about  east-southeast of Ylivieska town centre.

The airfield was opened in 1982, and it replaced the old airfield in Niemenkylä.

See also
List of airports in Finland

References

External links
 Town of Yliviska – Ylivieska Airfield 
 VFR Suomi/Finland – Ylivieska Airfield
 Lentopaikat.net – Ylivieska Airfield 

Airports in Finland
Airfield
Buildings and structures in North Ostrobothnia